Acmispon denticulatus (previously Lotus denticulatus) is a species of legume known by the common name riverbar bird's-foot trefoil. It is native to western North America from British Columbia to California to Utah, where it grows in moist spots in a number of habitat types. It is an annual herb growing erect or spreading to about 40 cm in maximum length. It is lined with leaves each made up of a few alternately arranged oval leaflets 1 to 2 cm long, sometimes slightly hairy in texture. The inflorescence is made up of one or two whitish to yellowish pealike flowers located in leaf axils. The fruit is a hairy legume pod up to about 1.5 cm long.

External links
Jepson eflora taxon page
USDA Plants Profile
Photo gallery

denticulatus